Felipe Gomes may refer to:

 Felipe Gomes (sprinter) (born 1986), Brazilian Paralympic sprinter
 Felipe Gomes (footballer) (born 1988), Brazilian football goalkeeper

See also
 Filipe Gomes (disambiguation)
 Felip Gomes (born 1978), Indian football defender